The 2020 Ligue Haïtienne was the 57th season of the Ligue Haïtienne, the top-tier football league in Haiti. The league Championnat National Haïtien Professionnel was supposed to be split into two tournaments — the Série d'Ouverture and the Série de Clôture — each with identical formats and each contested by the same 18 teams. The season began on 29 February 2020.

On 20 March, the season was suspended due to the COVID-19 pandemic. On 2 July, the season was declared abandoned.

Teams

Due to unrest in the country, last season was ended before all the matches were played. It was decided that none of the club from last year's edition of the competition would be relegated.

Two clubs from the Haitian second-level leagues were promoted for this season: Juventus and US Rivartibonitienne. This means the league for this season has expended from 16 to 18 clubs.

Série d'Ouverture

Regular season
The season was abandoned after four rounds were played.

Standings

Results

Playoffs

Quarterfinals

Semifinals

Finals
Winner qualifies for 2021 Caribbean Club Championship.

Série de Clôture

Regular season
A decision was made to transition the league to a fall-to-spring schedule. Due to this decision, this competition was cancelled.

Standings

Results

Playoffs

Quarterfinals

Semifinals

Finals
Winner qualifies for 2021 Caribbean Club Championship.

Trophée des Champions
Played between champions of Série d'Ouverture and Série de Clôture. This was cancelled.

Aggregate table
Due to the league's disruption, there was no promotion into or relegation out of the league this season.

References

2020
Haiti
Haiti
Ligue Haitienne
Ligue Haïtienne, 2020